Valenzuela fortunatus is a species of Psocoptera from Caeciliusidae family that is endemic to the Canary Islands.

References

Caeciliusidae
Insects described in 1929
Endemic fauna of the Canary Islands
Insects of the Canary Islands